The Rising Tide is a 1949 Canadian short documentary film directed by Jean Palardy. It was nominated for an Academy Award for Best Documentary Short.

The Rising Tide was produced by the National Film Board of Canada in cooperation with the governments of New Brunswick, Nova Scotia, and Prince Edward Island and the extension department of St. Francis Xavier University. The film shows how cooperatives in the Maritime provinces gave new life and hope to poverty-stricken fishermen. The Rising Tide received a special citation at the Canadian Film Awards.

See also
Herring Hunt, a 1953 NFB short documentary about BC's herring fishery

References

External links
The Rising Tide at the National Film Board of Canada

1949 films
1949 documentary films
1949 short films
Canadian black-and-white films
English-language Canadian films
National Film Board of Canada documentaries
Canadian Screen Award-winning films
Black-and-white documentary films
Canadian short documentary films
Films about the labor movement
Films set in the Maritimes
Documentary films about fishing
Fishing in Canada
National Film Board of Canada short films
Films scored by Robert Fleming
1940s Canadian films
1940s English-language films
1940s short documentary films